Han Feng (born on December 5, 1983 in Shijiazhuang, Hebei) is a Chinese footballer who currently plays for Shijiazhuang Ever Bright as a goalkeeper.

Club career
Beginning his career in 2002 for Guangzhou F.C. in the second tier, Han Feng would make his debut for the club on 23 March 2002 against Liaoning Xingguang in a 4-2 victory. He would retain his place within the team for the following league game against Xiamen Hongshi, that ended in a 1-0 defeat and also saw Han receive a red card. Despite this setback, Han would still be considered a promising goalkeeper and was subsequently named in the Chinese U-20 team.

By the 2005 league season Xiamen Blue Lions would be interested in his services in a player exchange for Li Wei. The move turned out to be a successful one when Xiamen would go on to win the division title and promotion to the top tier in 2005. The club, however would bring in international goalkeeper An Qi and Han often found himself playing as a second choice goalkeeper until the club were relegated and subsequently disbanded at the end of the 2007 league season.

As a free agent he would join Shenzhen Xiangxue Eisiti in the 2008 league season, however found himself as the team's third choice goalkeeper and would only make one appearance in the whole season in a league game on November 23, 2009 against Zhejiang Green Town in a 3-2 victory. This was his only appearance for the team before joining Hangzhou Greentown the following season where this time he was promoted to the team's second choice goalkeeper. This did not actually see him get much playing time until the 2010 league season saw Jiang Bo dropped as the team's first choice goalkeeper by the team's head coach Wu Jingui after a series of disappointing results. On 15 July 2016, Han transferred to Chinese Super League side Guangzhou R&F.

International career
Han Feng played for the Chinese U-17 team and would go on to be promoted to the Chinese U-20, however during his time with both teams he was unable to aid China in qualification for any major tournament.

Career statistics
Statistics accurate as of match played 31 December 2020.

Honours

Club
Xiamen Blue Lions
 China League One: 2005

Henan Jianye
China League One: 2013

References

External links
Player profile at Sodasoccer.com 
Player stats at sohu.com

1983 births
Living people
Sportspeople from Shijiazhuang
Association football goalkeepers
Chinese footballers
Footballers from Hebei
Guangzhou F.C. players
Xiamen Blue Lions players
Shenzhen F.C. players
Zhejiang Professional F.C. players
Henan Songshan Longmen F.C. players
Guangzhou City F.C. players
Cangzhou Mighty Lions F.C. players
Chinese Super League players
China League One players